Spraynard is an American punk band from West Chester, Pennsylvania.

History
Spraynard began in 2008 with the release of a split EP with Captain, We're Sinking via Creep Records.

In 2010 the band released a split with Paramedic! via Square of Opposition Records and a split with Sundials via Evil Weevil Records. In the same year Spraynard released their debut full-length album titled Cut and Paste via Runner Up Records.

On May 10, 2011 Spraynard released their second full-length studio album titled Funtitled via Asian Man Records.

On April 17, 2012 Spraynard released an EP titled Exton Square via Asian Man Records and Square of Opposition Records.

In 2014 Spraynard released a collection record titled The Mark Tom And Patrick Show via Asian Man Records.

On April 28, 2015, Jade Tree released a song titled "Bench" from Spraynard's then upcoming third full-length studio album. The album, titled Mable, premiered on July 8 via Stereogum and was officially released on July 10.

Pat Graham also sings and plays guitar in Big Nothing and Pat Ware plays drums in Joyce Manor.

Band members
Pat Graham - Guitar/Vocals 
Jake Guralnik - Bass 
Pat Ware - Drums/Vocals

Past members
Mark Dickinson - Bass

References

Musical groups from Pennsylvania
Musical groups established in 2008
Musical groups from Philadelphia
Pop punk groups from Pennsylvania